Benton Township is a township in Taylor County, Iowa, USA.

History
Benton Township was organized in 1851.

References

Townships in Taylor County, Iowa
Townships in Iowa
1851 establishments in Iowa
Populated places established in 1851